Caius is a masculine given name and a surname. It is also an alternate spelling of the Latin prenom Gaius (and verso). G and C are not exclusive in Latin and the correct pronunciation is debatable. It is most commonly pronounced  by native English speakers.

Caius may refer to:

People

Given name

Ancient world
 Pope Caius (died 296), Bishop of Rome and martyr
 Caius (bishop of Milan), bishop of Milan in the early 3rd-century, saint
 Caius (presbyter), early 3rd century Christian writer
 Caius Largennius (died c. 50), Roman legionary

Modern era
 Caius of Korea (1571–1624), Catholic missionary, one of the Martyrs of Japan
 Caius Brediceanu (1879–1953), Romanian politician and diplomat
 Caius Gabriel Cibber (1630–1700), Danish sculptor
 Caius Iacob (1912–1992), Romanian mathematician and politician
 Caius Lungu (born 1989), Romanian footballer
 Caius Novac (1821–?), Romanian footballer
 Caius Welcker (1885–1939), Dutch footballer

Surname
 John Caius the Elder, English poet
 John Caius (1510–1573), English physician and second founder of Gonville and Caius College, Cambridge
 Thomas Caius (died 1572), English academic and administrator, Fellow and Master of University College, Oxford

Fictional characters

In Shakespeare's plays
Caius, in the play King Lear, the name that the Earl of Kent takes when in disguise
Caius, the protagonist in Coriolanus
Caius Lucius, Roman ambassador and later general in Cymbeline
Doctor Caius, a French doctor in The Merry Wives of Windsor
Caius, a casual nomer used in Camus’ play “Caligula” to refer to the tyrannical emperor of the same name.

Other
Caius, in Sir John in Love, a 1929 English opera by Ralph Vaughan Williams, based on Shakespeare's The Merry Wives of Windsor
Caius, in the book The Skystone by Jack Whyte
Caius, in the Twilight series by Stephenie Meyer
Caius Ballad, the main antagonist in the video game Final Fantasy XIII-2
Caius Cosades, Grand Spymaster of the Blades in the video game The Elder Scrolls III: Morrowind
Caius, in the 1960 film Spartacus, played by John Hoyt
Caius Lao Vistaille, one of the protagonists in the manga (and later anime based on it) The Titan's Bride

See also
Caius Choirbook, an illuminated choirbook
Caio (disambiguation)
Cayo (disambiguation)
Cai (name)

Masculine given names
Romanian masculine given names

de:Gaius
it:Gaio (nome)
nl:Gaius
pl:Gajusz (imię)
ru:Гай
sk:Gaius
fi:Gaius (nimi)
sv:Gaius